Raharizonina nigrina is a species of beetle in the family Cerambycidae, and the only species in the genus Raharizonina. It was described by Quentin and Villiers in 1979.

References

Dorcasominae
Beetles described in 1979
Monotypic beetle genera